The elegant woodcreeper (Xiphorhynchus elegans) is a species of bird in the woodcreeper subfamily (Dendrocolaptinae). It was formerly considered a subspecies of Spix's woodcreeper. It is found in the western and southern Amazon in Bolivia, Brazil, Colombia, Ecuador, and Peru. Its natural habitat is tropical humid lowland forests. The subspecies X. e. juruanus is sometimes treated as a separate species, Juruá woodcreeper.

References

Xiphorhynchus
Birds of the Amazon Basin
Birds described in 1868
Taxonomy articles created by Polbot